Rangkhani is a village development committee in Baglung District in the Dhaulagiri Zone of central Nepal. At the time of the 1991 Nepal census it had a population of 3,981 and had 791 houses in the town.

References

Populated places in Baglung District